

Events 
 5 July – Annibale Zoilo joins the Sistine Chapel Choir in Rome as an alto.
 Luzzasco Luzzaschi becomes master of Duke Alfonso of Ferrara's private musica da camera, which was soon to become one of the most distinguished in Europe
 Orlande de Lassus is made a nobleman by Emperor Maximilian II, and knighted by Pope Gregory XIII
 Formation in Paris of Antoine de Baïf's Académie de Poésie et Musique, and consequent development of musique mesurée by composers such as Claude Le Jeune and Guillaume Costeley
 First appearance of the air de cour, a ubiquitous type of popular secular music in France until around 1650
 Lázaro del Álamo leaves his post as maestro di capilla in Mexico City
 Approximate date of the "Son de la Má Teodora", the earliest surviving example of son montuno from Cuba

Publications 
 Lodovico Agostini – First book of madrigals for five voices (Venice: Antonio Gardano and sons)
 Giovanni Animuccia – Second book of laudi (Rome: Camerali for Antonio Blado)
 Giammateo Asola – First book of masses for five voices (Venice: Antonio Gardano and sons)
 Ippolito Baccusi
First book of masses, for five and six voices (Venice: Girolamo Scotto)
First book of madrigals for five and six voices (Venice: Antonio Gardano and sons)
 Lodovico Balbi – First book of madrigals for four voices (Venice: Antonio Gardano and sons)
 Vincenzo Bellavere – First book of Giustiniane
 Maddalena Casulana – Second book of madrigals for four voices (Venice: Girolamo Scotto), the second printed collection of music by a woman in European history
 Pierre Certon –  (Paris: Nicolas Du Chemin), a collection of sacred songs for five, six, seven, and eight voices with one for nine and one for thirteen
 Francesco Corteccia – Responsories for four voices (Venice: the sons of Antonio Gardano)
 Guillaume Costeley –  (Paris: Le Roy & Ballard), a collection of French chansons for five voices
 Nicolao Dorati –  for four voices (Venice: Girolamo Scotto), containing settings of poems by Vittoria Colonna
 Andrea Gabrieli – Second book of madrigals for five voices (Venice: Antonio Gardano, figliuoli), also includes two for six voices and a dialogue for eight voices
 Francisco Guerrero – Motets for four, five, six, and eight voices (Venice: Antonio Gardano, figliuoli)
 Marc'Antonio Ingegneri – First book of madrigals for four voices (Venice)
 Nicolas de La Grotte –  (Paris: Le Roy & Ballard)
 Orlande de Lassus
5 Masses  (filled with sweet melodies) for four and five voices, book 2 (Venice: Claudio Correggio)
 for six voices (Munich: Adam Berg)
 Mattheus Le Maistre – First book of motets for five voices (Dresden: Gimel Bergen)
 Philippe de Monte – Third book of madrigals for five voices (Venice: Girolamo Scotto)
 Giovanni Pierluigi da Palestrina – Third book of masses, for four to six voices (Rome: heirs of Valerio & Luigi Dorico)

Classical music
Geert van Turnhout – Missa ‘O Maria vernans rosa’ a 5
Approximate date – Thomas Tallis – Spem in alium

Births 
June 13 (baptized) – Paul Peuerl, German composer and organist
June 18 (baptized) – Juan Pujol, Catalan composer (died 1626)
August 19 – Salamone Rossi, Italian composer (died 1630)
October 21 – Wolfgang Schonsleder, German composer and music theorist
 probable
 Giovanni Paolo Cima, Italian composer (died 1622)
 John Cooper (Coprario), English composer (died 1626)
 Ignazio Donati, Italian composer (died 1638)
 John Farmer, English madrigal composer (died 1605)
 Claudia Sessa, Italian composer.

Deaths 
January – Pierre Clereau, composer and choirmaster
March 25 – Johann Walter, German composer (born 1496)
September – Jean de Bonmarché, composer (born c.1525)
date unknown – Tomás de Santa María, Spanish music theorist, organist and composer
 probable
Jean Maillard, French composer (approximate date) (born c1515)
Diego Ortiz, Spanish music theorist and composer (approximate date) (born c1510)

References

 
Music
16th century in music
Music by year